Patricia Wilson Pheanious (born August 26, 1950) is an American politician who is the member of the Connecticut House of Representatives from the 53rd district in Windham County.

Political career

Election
Pheanious was elected in the general election on November 6, 2018, winning 52 percent of the vote over 48 percent of Republican candidate Sam Belsito.

References

 Connecticut Democrats
Members of the Connecticut House of Representatives 
Living people
21st-century American politicians
21st-century American women politicians
Women state legislators in Connecticut
1950 births